Benjamin James Hind (22 December 1882 – 1 April 1974) was an English cricketer. Hind was a right-handed batsman who bowled leg break. He was born at Nottingham, Nottinghamshire.

Hind made a single first-class appearance for Nottinghamshire against Yorkshire at Trent Bridge in the 1911 County Championship. Nottinghamshire won the toss and elected to bat first, making 141 all out, with Hind dismissed for 5 runs by George Hirst. In Yorkshire's first-innings of 266 all out, Hind bowled eleven wicketless overs which conceded 42 runs. In Nottinghamshire's second-innings of 98 all out, he was dismissed for 23 by Hirst, with Yorkshire winning what was to be his only first-class appearance by an innings and 27 runs.

He died at the city of his birth on 1 April 1974.

References

External links
Benjamin Hind at ESPNcricinfo
Benjamin Hind at CricketArchive

Cricketers from Nottingham
English cricketers
Nottinghamshire cricketers
1882 births
1974 deaths